Maqsudkənd (also, Makhsudkend and Maksudkend) is a village and municipality in the Khachmaz Rayon of Azerbaijan.  It has a population of 628.

References 

Populated places in Khachmaz District